The Silsden Hoard is an assemblage containing 27 gold coins of late British Iron Age date and a Roman iron finger ring.

Discovery
The hoard was discovered in 1998 by Jeff Walbank using a metal detector in a field at Silsden in West Yorkshire, England.  The hoard was declared to be treasure before being acquired by Bradford Art Galleries and Museums in 2000.  The hoard is now on display at Cliffe Castle Museum in Keighley, near where it was found.

Contents of the Hoard
The Silsden Hoard was found to contain 27 gold staters dating from the 1st century AD.  Most of the coins were issued by Cunobelinus, at various times throughout his reign.  Others were issued by his brother Epaticcus. Coins of the Corieltauvi were also part of the hoard.

In addition to the coins, an iron finger ring, almost certainly of Roman provenance, was also found.  The ring contains a gemstone bearing the figure of a man. The exact means of how this came to be a part of the hoard are still subject to debate.

Historical background
The hoard is one of three found in the former territories of the Brigantes, all of which contain Corieltauvian coins.  It is thought that the hoards were deposited by British refugees fleeing the Roman invasion of AD 43, under the Emperor Claudius and, as such, may be associated with accounts of the flight of Caratacus, the son of Cunobelinus, whose policies were used by the Romans as a pretext for the invasion.

See also
 List of hoards in Britain

External links
Bradford Art Galleries and Museums' description of the Hoard

History of West Yorkshire
Rings (jewellery)
Treasure troves of the Iron Age
Treasure troves of Roman Britain
Archaeological sites in West Yorkshire
Treasure troves in England
1998 in England
Metal detecting finds in England
1998 archaeological discoveries
Silsden
Hoards from Iron Age Britain